Nikoleta Trúnková (born 23 August 1998) is a Slovak female handball player for IUVENTA Michalovce and the Slovak national team.

She represented Slovakia at the 2021 World Women's Handball Championship in Spain.

References

1998 births
Living people
Slovak female handball players
Expatriate handball players
People from Bánovce nad Bebravou
Sportspeople from the Trenčín Region